Jack McCullough (born 28 November 1949) is a Canadian former cyclist. He competed in the team time trial at the 1972 Summer Olympics.

References

External links
 

1949 births
Living people
Canadian male cyclists
Olympic cyclists of Canada
Cyclists at the 1972 Summer Olympics
Sportspeople from Winnipeg